The following is a list of works by Japanese filmmaker and artist Hayao Miyazaki, divided into the categories of his early works, manga works, and filmography. Some of his most widely known works are his animated films created during his time with Studio Ghibli, including My Neighbor Totoro (1988), Princess Mononoke (1997), Spirited Away (2001), Howl's Moving Castle (2004), Ponyo (2008), and The Wind Rises (2013).

Early works (animation)

Filmography

Feature films

Short films

Music videos

Other credits

Manga works
The following list contains Hayao Miyazaki's works, both major and minor, since his debut as manga artist:

Bibliography
 Princess Mononoke: The First Story (1993)
 Starting Point: 1979-1996 (1996)
 Turning Point: 1997-2008 (2014, English translation)

References

External links 
 Studio Ghibli 
 
 
 

 
Director filmographies
Japanese filmographies